Hurricane is an American heavy metal band formed in 1983, originally featuring current Foreigner lead vocalist Kelly Hansen (vocals/rhythm guitar), Robert Sarzo (guitar), Tony Cavazo (bass), and Jay Schellen (drums). Cavazo and Sarzo are the younger brothers of Quiet Riot's Carlos Cavazo and Rudy Sarzo.

Hurricane released four albums: Take What You Want (1985), Over the Edge (1988), Slave to the Thrill (1990), and Liquifury (2001). Over the Edge was their most successful album featuring their only charting song, "I'm on to You", which peaked at No. 33 on the Billboard Mainstream Rock Tracks chart in 1988.

History 
Quiet Riot's Kevin DuBrow introduced Robert Sarzo and Tony Cavazo in the early 1980s. After deciding to form a band, Sarzo and Cavazo recruited singer Kelly Hansen, drummer Jay Schellen and guitarist Michael Guy. With little label interest, the band decided to release an album themselves, Take What You Want. The album and constant touring led to them getting a major label deal.

Increasing popularity
In 1986 and 1987, they opened for Stryper on their To Hell with the Devil album tour. They were soon signed to Enigma Records, the same label as Stryper. They also opened for Gary Moore's 1987 US tour.

In 1988, the band released their major label debut album, Over the Edge. Propelled by a powerful, yet melodic heavy metal sound, the album made #92 on the US album charts and featured a cover of Alice Cooper's "I'm Eighteen," as well as the band's most successful song, the Jeff Jones-penned "I'm on to You." The title track, "Over the Edge", was also released as a single.

In 1989, Sarzo left the group and was replaced by ex-Lion guitarist, Doug Aldrich. This lineup recorded the album Slave to the Thrill, which was released in 1990. While AllMusic described the record as the band's most "focused" album, it did not sell as well as its predecessor. The album's relative lack of success could be attributed to changing musical climates. Shortly after the release of this album, Aldrich moved on to Bad Moon Rising and the rest of the group disbanded.

Aftermath
In 1991, Schellen wrote, recorded and toured extensively with both Unruly Child and Sircle of Silence, while Hansen did a considerable amount of session work. Schellen suggested that Hansen help with the recording of Unruly Child's second release, and shortly after they agreed to resurrect Hurricane. English-born blues guitarist Sean Manning (former bandmate and Kevin Dubrow/Quiet Riot guitarist) (guitar) and Larry Antonino (bass) rounded out the new version of the band, who released Liquifury. Guitarists Carlos Villalobos and Randall Strom also appear as session musicians on this album, performing on one track apiece. Villalobos also co-wrote the track on which he performs. In the late 1990s, Schellen began a continuing collaboration with Billy Sherwood, encompassing World Trade, Conspiracy (with Chris Squire of Yes) and CIRCA:. Schellen joined the progressive pop band Asia in 2005. He now tours with Yes.

Hansen joined Foreigner, and Aldrich is currently in the Las Vegas production Raiding The Rock Vault.

Manning went on to form The Exiles with three other English expatriates, original Bonham vocalist Paul Rafferty, bassist Paul Stanley, and drummer Terry Muscall. The band split up in the mid 1990s but a collection of demos, in part co-produced by Pat Benatar guitarist Neil Giraldo, surfaced in 1996 as Sean Manning & Paul Raffery's The Exiles (Indivision/SDM), with additional musical contributions by Giraldo, longtime Benatar drummer Myron Grombacher, Greg D'Angelo, and Richard Baker, among others.

In 2010, Robert Sarzo and Tony Cavazo, founding members, reunited and recruited singer Andrew Freeman and drummer Mike Hansen. They announced a tour and a CD in 2011.

In 2013, it was announced that Sarzo would be named the new lead guitarist of Geoff Tate's version of Queensrÿche.

Hurricane was the opening act on the 2014 tour with Tate's Queensrÿche. Sarzo played with both the opening and headlining acts on the entire tour. Singer Jason Ames handled lead vocal duties on the tour.

Members

Current members
 Robert Sarzo – lead guitar, backing vocals 
 Tony Cavazo – bass guitar, backing vocals 
 Mike Hansen – drums 
 Chad Cancino – lead vocals 

Former members
 Kelly Hansen – lead vocals, rhythm guitar, keyboards 
 Jay Schellen – drums, percussion, backing vocals 
 Michael Guy – lead guitar, backing vocals 
 Doug Aldrich – lead guitar, backing vocals 
 Larry Antonino – bass, backing vocals 
 Sean Manning – lead guitar, backing vocals 
 Andrew Freeman – lead vocals, rhythm guitar 
 Jason Ames – lead vocals 
 Michael O'Mara - lead vocals 

Timeline

Discography

Studio albums
 Take What You Want (1985)
 Over the Edge (1988)
 Slave to the Thrill (1990)
 Liquifury (2001)

Singles
 "Over the Edge" (1988)
 "I'm on to You" (1988)
 "Next to You" (1990)
 "Dance Little Sister" (1990)

References

External links
 Hurricane page @ Sleaze Roxx

1983 establishments in California
Glam metal musical groups from California
Heavy metal musical groups from California
Musical groups established in 1983